W33ED-D (channel 54) is a religious television station serving Eastern Puerto Rico licensed to Vieques. The station is owned by TV Red Puerto Rico. The station's transmitter is located at Puerto Ferro in Vieques.

Digital channels
The station's digital signal is multiplexed:

External links

33ED-D
Low-power television stations in the United States